Anthology 1969–81 is a 2009 compilation album by British rock band Atomic Rooster.

It consists mostly of unlicensed tracks, whose copyright is owned by Sanctuary (who purchased the B&C and Dawn catalogues), EMI and Polydor Records.

Track listing
CD 1
 "Devil's Answer" 4:00 - 1970 demo with Carl Palmer
 "Death Walks Behind You" 7:18 - Death Walks Behind You album version
 "VUG" 4:32 - 1970 demo with Carl Palmer
 "Friday the 13th" aka "Save Me" 3:28 - US version
 "A Spoonful of Bromide Helps the Pulse Rate Go Down" 4:37 - In Hearing of Atomic Rooster album version
 "Sleeping for Years" 5:25 - Death Walks Behind You album version
 "Seven Lonely Streets" 6:41 - Death Walks Behind You album version
 "It's So Unkind" 4:05 - unreleased track 1979
 "Head in the Sky" 5:37 - In Hearing of Atomic Rooster album version
 "Break the Ice" 4:57  - In Hearing of Atomic Rooster album version
 "I Can't Take No More" 3:31 - Death Walks Behind You album version
 "Play the Game" 4:45 - standard single version
 "When You Go to Bed" 3:42 - unreleased track 1979
 "They Took Control of You" 4:48
CD 2
 "Do You Know Who's Looking for You?" 3:04
 "Broken Window" 3:47
 "Hold it Through the Night" 3:09 - unreleased track 1981
 "No Change by Me" 3:15 - unreleased track 1981
 "Play it Again" 3:11
 "End of the Day" 3:28
 "The Rock" 4:22 - In Hearing of Atomic Rooster album version
 "Gershatzer" 8:00 - Death Walks Behind You album version
 "Shabooloo" aka "Before Tomorrow" 5:47 - Atomic Roooster album version
 "Nobody Else" 4:42 - Death Walks Behind You album version, without backwards vocal intro
 "Don't Lose Your Mind" 3:35
 "She's My Woman" 3:12
 "Devil's Answer" 4:10 - live in Milan 1981
 "Death Walks Behind You" 5:35 - live studio version 1981
 "Tomorrow Night" 4:49 - live studio version 1981

Atomic Rooster compilation albums
2009 compilation albums
Angel Air albums